Leander Paes and Radek Štěpánek were the defending champions, but did not compete as a team this year.
Štěpánek did not enter the tournament, citing an injury, while Paes played alongside Michaël Llodra, but lost in the second round to Grigor Dimitrov and Frederik Nielsen.
Aisam-ul-Haq Qureshi and Jean-Julien Rojer won the title, defeating Mariusz Fyrstenberg and Marcin Matkowski in the final 6–4, 6–1.

Seeds

Draw

Finals

Top half

Bottom half

References
Main Draw

Sony Open Tennis - Men's Doubles
Men's doubles
Men in Florida